Handke is a surname. Notable people with the surname include:

 Johann Christoph Handke (1694–1774), Moravian baroque painter
 Peter Handke (born 1942), Austrian writer and playwright
 Rebecca Handke (born 1986), German pair skater

See also
Hanke

German-language surnames
Surnames from given names